The 2009 Texas State Bobcats football team represented Texas State University–San Marcos—now known as Texas State University—as a member of the Southland Conference (SLV) during the 2009 NCAA Division I FCS football season. Led by third-year head coach Brad Wright, the Bobcats compiled and overall record of 7–4 with a mark of 5–2 in conference play, placing third in the SLC.
Texas State played their home games at Bobcat Stadium in San Marcos, Texas.

Schedule

References

Texas State
Texas State Bobcats football seasons
Texas State Bobcats football